Making the Headlines is a 1938 American crime film directed by Lewis D. Collins and starring Jack Holt.

Cast
Jack Holt as Lt. Lewis Nagel
Beverly Roberts as Jeane  Sanford
Craig Reynolds as Steve Withers
Marjorie Gateson as Muffin Wilder
Dorothy Appleby as Claire Sanford
Gilbert Emery as Edmund Sanford
Tom Kennedy as Sgt. Handley
Corbet Morris as Ronald Sanford
Sheila Bromley as Grace Sanford
John Wray as Herbert Sanford

See also
 List of American films of 1938

External links
 
 

Films directed by Lewis D. Collins
Columbia Pictures films
1930s English-language films
1938 films
American crime drama films
1938 crime drama films
American black-and-white films
1930s American films